Meadow Sisto (born September 30, 1972, in Grass Valley, California) is an American actress mostly known for playing Caroline in the 1992 film Captain Ron. Sisto is the daughter of Dick Sisto, a jazz vibist and Reedy Gibbs, an actress. Her younger brother, Jeremy Sisto, is also an actor. She lives in Portland, Oregon.

Filmography

Film

Television

References

External links

1972 births
20th-century American actresses
21st-century American actresses
Actresses from California
American film actresses
American television actresses
Living people
People from Grass Valley, California
American people of Italian descent